GUD or Gud may refer to:

Arts and entertainment 
 GUD (band), an Australian trio
 Gud (music producer) (born 1995), Swedish DJ, producer and rapper
 GUD Magazine, an American literary periodical

Medicine 
 Genital ulcer disease
 Wilms tumor protein (AEWS-GUD)

Other uses 
 Yocoboué Dida language, spoken in Ivory Coast (ISO 639-3: gud)
 Groupe Union Défense, a French far-right political group
 Guadeloupe, an overseas territory of France in the Caribbean (UNDP code: GUD)
 Jaggery, a traditional form of sugar cane

See also 
 God (disambiguation)
 Good (disambiguation)